Gauge conversion is the changing of one railway track gauge (the distance between the running rails) to another.

Sleepers
If tracks are converted to a narrower gauge, the existing sleepers (ties) may be used. However, replacement is required if the conversion is to a wider gauge. Some sleepers may be long enough to accommodate the fittings of both existing and alternative gauges. Wooden sleepers are suitable for conversion because they can be drilled for the repositioned rail spikes. Being difficult to drill, concrete sleepers are less suitable for conversion. Steel sleepers may have alternative gauge fittings cast at production, may be drilled for new fittings or may be welded with new fittings.

Structures
Conversion from a narrow to a wider gauge may require enlargement of  the structure gauge of the bridges, overpasses and tunnels, embankments and cuts. The minimum curve radius may have a larger radius on broader gauges requiring route deviations to allow the minimum curve radius to be increased. Track centers at stations with multiple tracks may also have to be increased. Conversion from narrow to standard gauge can cause several changes not because of the gauge itself, but in order to be compatible with the structure gauge of standard gauge track, such as height of overpasses so that trains can be exchanged. The choice of train couplers may be a factor as well.

Rail vehicles

Where vehicles move to a different gauge, they must either be prepared for bogie exchange or be prepared for wheelset exchange. This process is known as "gauge change". Goods wagons are still subject to either bogie exchange or wheelset exchange.

Steam locomotives
 

Some steam locomotives were constructed to be reconfigured to a different gauge: for example, some East African Railways locomotives; Garratts; the large 500, 600 and 700 class locomotives of the South Australian Railways introduced by William Webb in 1926; and the Victorian Railways J, N and R classes. In the Australian instances, conversion was anticipated from  broad gauge to  standard gauge. Conversion to a wider gauge was similarly anticipated for the large  narrow-gauge Western Australian Government Railways V class locomotive (to standard gauge). Of these locomotives, only one R class was converted (when in preservation). Two unanticipated conversions to occur were the ten locomotives of the South Australian Railways 740 class (from standard to broad gauge) and five  narrow-gauge T class locomotives, which became the Tx class on the broad gauge before they were eventually converted back again.

Gauge-change in steam locomotives has a long lineage. In about 1860, the Bristol and Exeter Railway converted five  locomotives to  gauge, and later converted them back again. Also in the 19th century, in the United States, some  broad-gauge locomotives were designed for easy conversion to  gauge. In the 20th century, in Victoria station, London, some  broad-gauge locomotive classes of the Great Western Railway were designed for easy conversion to  gauge. After World War II, a number of captured German 03 class Pacifics locomotives were re-gauged to the  Russian gauge.

Diesel and electric locomotives and trains
Most diesel and electric rolling stock can undergo gauge conversion by replacement of their bogies. Engines with fixed wheelbases are more difficult to convert. In Australia, diesel locomotives are regularly re-gauged between broad, standard and narrow gauges.

Wagons and coaches
Gauge conversion of wagons and coaches involves the replacement of the wheelsets or the bogies. In May 1892, wagons and coaches were converted when the  gauge of the Great Western Railway was abandoned.

Gauge orphan
During or after gauge conversion work, some stations and branch lines may become "gauge orphans". This occurs especially when it is not considered economically worthwhile to go to the expense of gauge conversion. For example, on the standard gauge line between Adelaide and Melbourne, the broad gauge Victor Harbor branch line became a gauge orphan after the main line was converted in 1995 because it was too lightly trafficked; it now prospers as a heritage line, SteamRanger.

See also
Rail transport

 List of gauge conversions
 Break-of-gauge
 Dual gauge

Notes

References

Track gauges